The Sun Odyssey 36.2, also called the Jeanneau 36.2, is a French sailboat that was designed by Jacques Fauroux as a cruiser and first built in 1998.

The same basic design was also sold with different interior layouts as the Moorings 36.2 for Moorings Yacht Charter and as the Stardust 363.2 for the general yacht charter market.

Production
The design was built by Jeanneau in France, starting in 1998, but it is now out of production.

Design
The Sun Odyssey 36.2 is a recreational keelboat, built predominantly of fiberglass, with wood trim. The hull has plywood reinforcements. It has a masthead sloop rig with two sets of spreaders and aluminum spars made by Z-Diffusion of France. The hull has a raked stem, a reverse transom with steps and a swimming platform, an internally mounted spade-type rudder controlled by a  diameter wheel and a fixed fin keel. It displaces  and carries  of ballast.

The design has sleeping accommodation for four to six people, with two cabin "owner" models and three cabin charter models. Both have a double "V"-berth in the bow cabin, a starboard "L"-shaped settee in the main cabin and either an aft cabin with a double berth or two smaller aft cabins. Models sold in the US have a main cabin fold out settee berth to port, while those sold in Europe have two seats instead. The galley is located on the starboard side just forward of the companionway ladder. The galley is "L"-shaped and is equipped with a two-burner stove, an ice box and a double sink. A navigation station is opposite the galley, on the port side. The head is located aft on the port side and includes a shower. There are two heads, one just aft of the bow cabin on the port side and one on the starboard side in the aft cabin.

Operational history
In a 1997 review for Practical Sailor Darrell Nicholson wrote, "In profile, the bow has a short overhang and the sheerline is nearly flat. Its displacement/length ratio is 193, which is moderately low, meaning there is not much volume below the waterline and that there is a definite emphasis on speed. But because the 36.2 is intended to be an all-around family boat, the sail area to displacement ratio is a relatively conservative 15.9. The sail plan offers plenty of power to move her, but shouldn't require unusually early reefing to keep her on her lines. Comparatively flatbottomed boats such as the 36.2 like to be sailed fairly level and may exhibit undesirable handling tendencies when heeled excessively."

See also
List of sailing boat types

References

External links

Photo of a Sun Odyssey 36.2

Keelboats
1990s sailboat type designs
Sailing yachts
Sailboat type designs by Jacques Fauroux
Sailboat types built by Jeanneau